David is a 2020 American comedy-drama short film, directed by Zach Woods and written by Woods and Brandon Gardner. It stars Will Ferrell, William Jackson Harper and Fred Hechinger. It concerns a therapist's attempts to balance his relationships between his wrestler son and his suicidal patient, both named David. It is distributed worldwide by the International Production & Distribution company Salaud Morisset.

It had its world premiere at the 2020 Toronto International Film Festival on September 11, 2020.  It was the only American short film selected for the 2020 Cannes Film Festival.

Plot 
David calls his therapist to schedule an appointment after having suicidal thoughts. As they are in the middle of a session, a young man in a wrestler's uniform runs up and bangs on the window. The therapist tells David to ignore him, but the young man comes in. It turns out that the young man, also named David, is the therapist's son and was preparing for a match he is to have with a "beast" named Andy Doan. The therapist was supposed to attend, but he chose to put it off in favor of helping David. Despite David saying it is okay to postpone the session, the therapist insists that he stay and that young David leave. Father and son get into an argument about their relationship and the therapist's insistence that David's problem is more important, despite David becoming more and more detached from the situation. When young David claims that he will get a wrestler's scholarship, the therapist tells him that he will not because he barely made the team, resulting in young David telling him that he is not a good father. The therapist tells him that it is difficult to take back things that have been said and young David cries. David, sympathizing with young David, goes up and hugs him. Later, young David wrestles Andy Doan and loses almost immediately. As he stands back up, he looks into the crowd to see both his father and David, who stand up and applaud his effort, have come to see him and smiles.

Cast
Will Ferrell as Therapist
William Jackson Harper as David
Fred Hechinger as David
Corey Jantzen as Andy Doan
Sebastian Vale as Referee

Release
The film had its world premiere at the Toronto International Film Festival on September 11, 2020. The film was initially set to world premiere at the 2020 Cannes Film Festival in May 2020, prior to its cancellation due to the COVID-19 pandemic. It was also set to screen at the Telluride Film Festival in September 2020, prior to its cancellation. It was released on the Team Coco YouTube channel on December 1, 2021.

Awards 
Since its launch, the film has been selected in many festivals around the world.

References

External links

2020 films
2020 short films
American short films
2020 comedy-drama films
2020s English-language films